Llancacura is a hamlet located east of the main chain of the Andes and  east of city of Lonquimay in Malleco Province, southern Chile. It lies in uppermost part of Biobío River's basin and next the Pacific-Atlantic continental divide. It lies along Chile Route 181 next to the Argentine border with the international crossing of  Pino Hachado Pass being next to the hamlet.

References

Geography of Araucanía Region
Populated places in Malleco Province